Nagyrada is a village in Zala County, Hungary.  It is bordered by Austria in the west.

External links 
 Street map 

Populated places in Zala County